Michael Diamond may refer to:
 Michael Diamond (sport shooter) (born 1972), Australian Olympic sport shooter
 Mike D (born 1965), American musician and member of the hip-hop group Beastie Boys
 BloodPop (previously known as Michael Diamond), music producer, songwriter, musician

See  also
 Michael "Diamond" Gargano, founding member and bass player for rock group Legs Diamond